David John J. Carnivale (born April 29, 1958) is an architect, preservationist, author, and artist. He wrote The Affordable House, which was the second book to appear cover-to-cover on the internet (March 1996), featured on the web's first architectural website The Affordable House. Since 2005 it has been published by BookSurge.com.

In 2000, David Carnivale stopped the demolition of, and subsequently restored, the 1678 Lakeman-Cortelyou-Taylor House in New Dorp, Staten Island. In 2005, he stopped the demolition of the 1825 Seaman Cottage which was instead relocated to Richmondtown Restoration, Staten Island. Carnivale has also been active in helping a number of other notable Staten Island structures become designated as landmarks, and for his efforts has won a number of preservation awards. His architectural practice to date has produced plans to approximately 500 projects, including a planned new community and an airport, both in Tennessee, as well as residences in two dozen states and many Manhattan commercial projects.

Awards

Lawsuit
From 2001 to 2005, he filed lawsuits against New York State concerning a new continuing education requirement passed by the legislature but written by a special-interest group for their own financial benefit; as a pro se plaintiff his complaint was put on the 2004 docket of the U.S. Supreme Court. He did not prevail but he rewrote the suit and brought it to the New York State Supreme Court based on NYS Constitutional protections, and the state amended the law in question to satisfy much of Mr. Carnivale's complaint.

Background
A native Staten Islander, he was raised in Richmondtown Restoration where he spent his youth helping restore the historic village's Dutch and English colonial era buildings, and learning American architectural history from one of the founders of the restoration (and the island's first Borough Historian) Loring McMillen. Attended Susan E. Wagner High School 1972-1976; Staten Island Community College and Richmond College 1976-1978 (all on S.I.); New York Institute of Technology (Manhattan campus 1978-1980 and Old Westbury L.I. campus 1980-1982) and one semester at the American Academy in Rome in 1981.

References

Staten Island Advance. Thursday, April 16, 2009.  Volume 124  Number 30,019 Page E6 "Preservation crusader to be honored citywide" by Tevah Platt.
Staten Island Advance. Friday, October 24, 2008. Page A4 "Preservationists hail the work of 2 Islanders" by Advance staff writer.
Staten Island Advance. Sunday, October 15, 2006. Page A9 "Veterans undaunted in quest for cemetery here" by Stephanie Slepian (re: Carnivale's cemetery plans)
Staten Island Advance. Saturday, January 8, 2005. Page A3 "No sites found for veterans' cemetery" by Diane O'Donnell (re:Carnivale's cemetery plans)
Staten Island Advance. Tuesday, March 27, 2001. Pages a1 & A8 "17th century house to stand a while longer" by Karen O'Shea (re: Lakeman house)
Staten Island Advance. Friday, December 31, 1999. Pages A15 &A18 "Hidden treasure may shine again" by Kathleen Lucadamo (re: Lakeman House)
Staten Island Advance. Thursday, March 4, 1999. Volume 113, Number 26, 564 Pages 1, D1 & D3 "Home, Home on the Web" by Karen O'Shea (re:)
Staten Island Advance. June 13, 1976. "Islander wins 7 art awards" by Advance staff writer

External links
The Affordable House
Staten Island Advance
New York Institute Of Technology

20th-century American architects
People from Staten Island
1958 births
Living people
21st-century American architects